Chaplygin is a large lunar impact crater that lies on the far side of the Moon. It is located to the southeast of the huge walled plain Mendeleev, about midway between the craters Schliemann to the northeast and Marconi to the southwest. It is about the same size as Albategnius on the near side.

The rim of this crater is roughly circular; however, the edge is uneven. The inner wall is terraced around much of the circumference, and this structure is somewhat disrupted along the southern side. The rim is only mildly eroded, with few craters around the edge — the exception being Chaplygin K which is intruding into the inner wall along the southeast side. Within the walls is an interior plain that is level and smooth in comparison to the rugged terrain that surrounds the exterior of the crater. There is a central peak near the midpoint, and a few tiny craters lie scattered across the surface.

A small, bright crater on the northeastern rim is called Chaplygin B.  It is nicknamed Chappy by the LROC team.

Satellite craters
By convention these features are identified on lunar maps by placing the letter on the side of the crater midpoint that is closest to Chaplygin.

References

 
 
 
 
 
 
 
 
 

Impact craters on the Moon